Para (Special Forces), also known as Para SF, is a group of special forces battalions of the Parachute Regiment in the Indian Army. These units specialize in various roles including counter-terrorism, hostage rescue, unconventional warfare, special reconnaissance, counter-insurgency and  direct action.

The unit's heritage stems from World War II, with the creation of the 50th Parachute Brigade in October 1941 under the British Indian Army. 9 Para SF was raised in 1966 as the 9th Parachute Commando Battalion (as part of the Parachute Regiment) and is the oldest among the fifteen Para SF units of the Indian Army. It has been involved in various operations including the Indo-Pakistan war of 1971, Operation Bluestar, Operation Pawan, Operation Cactus, Kargil War, Operation Ginger, 2015 Indian counter-insurgency operation in Myanmar, 2016 Pampore stand-off,  2016 Indian Line of Control strike and in several anti-terror operations.

History

The parachute units of the Indian Army are among the oldest airborne units in the world. The 50th Indian Parachute Brigade was formed on 27 October 1941, comprising the British 151st Parachute Battalion, the British Indian Army 152nd Indian Parachute Battalion, and the 153rd Gurkha Parachute Battalion. The Parachute Regiment was formed from these and several other units in 1952.

In 1944, the 50th was allocated to the newly founded 44th Airborne Division. In the post-independence restructuring, India retained only one parachute brigade—the 50th. This brigade consisted of three distinguished battalions personally nominated by the then Commander-in-Chief, namely 1 PARA (Punjab), 2 PARA (Maratha) and 3 PARA (Kumaon). During the Jammu and Kashmir operations of 1947-48 these battalions distinguished themselves with glory in the battles of Shelatang, Naushera, Jhangar and Poonch, and were awarded the respective Battle Honours.

On 15 April 1952, the three battalions serving with the Parachute Brigade were removed from their respective Infantry Regiments to form the Parachute Regiment. Since then the Parachute Regiment has grown to comprise ten battalions including Parachute (Special Forces) battalions. In 1986, 8 PARA became 12 Battalion, Mechanised Infantry Regiment, while 21 Maratha LI converted to PARA (Special Forces). During their short but eventful existence so far, the regiment's battalions have had extensive operational experience, and singular achievements, to speak of their level of professionalism.

During the Indo-Pakistani War of 1965, an ad hoc commando unit, named Meghdoot Force, consisting of volunteers from various infantry units was organized by then Major Megh Singh of the Brigade of the Guards. The unit performed exceptionally well during the war destroying many strategic bridges and killing many Pakistani soldiers, and thus the Government authorized the formal raising of a commando unit. Lt Col Megh Singh was selected to raise the unit which was originally intended to be a part of the Brigade of the Guards. However, recognizing parachute qualification as an integral element of special operations, the unit was transferred to the Parachute Regiment and raised as its 9th Battalion (Commando) on 1 July 1966. The erstwhile members of the Meghdoot Force formed the nucleus, and the new unit was based in Gwalior. In June 1967 the unit was split equally into two to form a second commando unit, designated as 10th Battalion, each with three Companies. 10th Battalion was mandated to operate in the Western Desert and 9th Battalion in the northern mountains. In 1969, these battalions were re-designated as 9 and 10 Para (Commando) battalions.

In 1978, the 1 Para, as an experiment, was converted to become the first special forces unit of the Indian army, and was kept as the tactical reserve. Already a recipient of the Chief of Army Staff Unit Citation twice, and the GOC-in-C Eastern Command Unit Citation once, the unit was originally 1 Punjab, which was later re-designated as 1 PARA (Punjab) and in 1978 was converted to 1 PARA (SF).

On 15 January 1992, the Parachute Regiment Training Centre along with the Records and PAO (OR), and the Para Regiment, moved to Bangalore and occupied the erstwhile location of Pioneer Corps and Training Centre. Bangalore is the new Key Location Project of the centre.

1995 saw the formation of the fourth commando battalion when 21 Maratha Light Infantry was selected to convert to special forces and slated for the Eastern Command. After a stringent selection and training process that spanned more than a year, on 1 February 1996, the unit under Colonel VB Shinde, was formally inducted as the 21st Battalion (Special Forces), The Parachute Regiment. The unit has done well in its short lifespan and is the proud recipient of the Chief of Army Staff Unit Citation thrice (1992, 2006 and 2011) and the GOC-in-C Eastern Command Unit Citation twice (2008 and 2016), as well as a host of individual gallantry awards. Most notable operations being in the Loktak Lake of Manipur. With the changing scenario in military operations and the need for more special forces units, 2 Para began the conversion process from parachute to special forces role, followed closely by the 3rd Para and the 4th Para in the year 2004 and 2005. Further 11th Para (SF) in 2011, 12th Para (SF) in 2013 and 13th Para (SF) in 2022 were raised from within the strength of the regiment to augment the strength of the existing Special Forces battalions. In 2022, 5th Para, 6th Para, 7th Para, 23rd Para and 29th Para, the airborne punch of Indian Army was redesignated and were given the specialist role with dual tasking of Airborne as well as the special tasks giving a significant boost to operational capability of Indian Army.

1971 Indo-Pakistan War
The assault team killed 73 and wounded 140 on the Pakistani side. In addition, they also destroyed 35mm artillery guns of the Pakistan independent battery. They also destroyed an airfield. In Bangladesh 2 PARA (Airborne), which was a part of 50 (Independent) Parachute Brigade, carried out India's first airborne assault operation to capture Poongli Bridge in Mymensingh District near Dhaka. Subsequently, they were the first unit to enter Dhaka. For this action 2 PARA were given the Battle Honour of Poongli Bridge and the Theatre Honour Dhaka. In the Western Sector the unit was also involved in the Battle of Chamb.

Operation Mandhol

Operation Mandhol was a raid carried out by soldiers from the 9 Para (SF) to seek and destroy Pakistani artillery located in hostile territory near a village called Mandole. During the operation, aided by an artillery officer Capt. D Tyagi from 195 Mountain Regiment, six artillery guns were destroyed by a raiding team composed of six officers and around 120 soldiers led by Major C. M. Malhotra. The special forces raiders began their operation at 5.30 PM on 13 December 1971. They started off from Poonch and crossed the Poonch River. After they reached the Mandole village, they started searching for the artillery guns and eventually located them. The raiders divided themselves into six teams. Each one of the six team was tasked to destroy one of the six guns. Subsequently, an intense gunfight took place between the Indian raiders and Pakistan Army soldiers. The gunfight resulted in two Indian casualties namely Paratrooper Rajmal and Paratrooper Balwan Singh who was a resident of Village Moungri of District Udhampur of J&K and many Pakistani casualties, with some Pakistani soldiers escaping from the battle. Finally, the raiders destroyed all the artillery using explosives and returned to their base at 6.30 AM on 14 December 1971.

This operation caused the Pakistan military to tweak its military doctrine by assigning additional soldiers for defending artillery guns. Pakistan Army officials, who came to India as a delegation after the war had ended, acknowledged the raid. Operation Mandhol is now a part of the syllabus at the Indian Military Academy.

Chachro Raid 

A series of raids were conducted by soldiers from the 10 Para (also known as The Desert Scorpions) at Chachro, Virawah, Nagarparkar and Islamkot during the 1971 Indo-Pakistani war. The main objective of these raids were to hit Pakistan military installations located 80 kilometres inside hostile territory, disrupting supply lines, creating confusion and undertake important inroads into hostile territory. Two teams, codenamed Alpha and Charlie, trained for a duration of five months in skills such as desert warfare.

During the raids, the Indian commandos inserted themselves 80 kilometres deep into Pakistani territory and traversed a distance of over 500 kilometres, attacking Pakistan military installations and positions. They completed the raids with zero Indian casualties.

The raids began on 5 December 1971, when commandos from the 10 Para penetrated 70 kilometres inside hostile territory. The soldiers went into a defensive posture as they encountered heavy firing from Pakistani posts. The Indian raiders sent one of their vehicles rushing towards Pakistani positions, firing a LMG, to distract gunfire. This tactic was successful because of the cover provided by nighttime. Subsequently, the other raiders too opened fire and overpowered the Pakistani posts.

Soon, a pathfinder team was assigned the task of charting a route for the Alpha team to attack the wing headquarters of the Pakistan Rangers in Chachro. The pathfinders used the cover of darkness to chart a suitable route and green-lighted the raid before the dawn of 7 December. Within a few hours, the team killed 17 Pakistani soldiers, took 12 prisoners and captured Chachro. After this raid, the Charlie team exfiltrated out of the battlefield. Chachro was subsequently handed over to Indian infantrymen and the Alpha team proceeded further.

The Alpha team moved towards their next targets: Virawah and Nagarparkar. They reached Virawah before the dawn of 8 December, moving in broad daylight the preceding day. The first contact made by the raiders with the Pakistani soldiers was at 1:30 AM. Hand-to-hand combat between the Indian raiders and the Pakistanis ensued, followed by gunfights. Soon, Virawah was captured by the Indian raiders. The raiders then proceeded to Nagarparkar and captured it by the morning of 8 December.

Following this, the Indian raiders had returned to their base in India but were again tasked to attack an ammunition dump in Islamkot. The raiders reached their target at 5:30 AM on 17 December but found the target empty. Subsequently, while retreating, the raiders ambushed a Pakistani convoy, killing 18-20 Pakistani troops and imprisoning survivors.

Operation Bluestar 1984

In 1984 the Para (SF) were involved in Operation Blue Star. They were charged to lead an attack to evict Sikh militants hiding inside the Holy Site of the Sikh religion the Golden Temple Punjab. 80 members of 1 Para (SF) were given the task of assaulting two areas of the temple, one of which required divers. However, there were a number of setbacks as a result of inaccurate intelligence on the strength of the militants who were trained by Gen. Shabeg Singh (ex-1 Para himself), operating in low light, the conventional manner of the raid, and the lack of incentive, all of which resulted in a mission failure. The diver mission was aborted after the first team got bogged down. The commandos accompanied by Raghunath Dubey achieved their aims after a gunfight with militants that lasted hours.

Sri Lanka 1987

The late 1980s saw the Para (SF) in action in Sri Lanka, as part of Operation Pawan. However, the lack of proper planning by the Indian Peace Keeping Force (IPF), and insufficient intelligence on the Liberation Tigers of Tamil Eelam's (LTTE) whereabouts, caused the initial heli-borne assault on Jaffna University on 11 October 1987 to be a tragic failure. However it was because of the efforts of the Para (SF) that later led to the capture of the Jaffna peninsula, forcing the LTTE militants to take refuge in the forests.

Six soldiers lost their lives in that mission. Due to their superior training, the Para (SF) took refuge under a house, after they were misled by a youth who offered his services to help the commandos track Velupillai Prabhakaran but instead took them on a wild goose chase. They engaged the enemy for 24 hours and picked up all their dead with their weapons after reinforcements arrived the next morning.

After the failed assault on Jaffna City, the 10 Para (SF) participated in a heli-borne assault on the town of Moolai  to the north west in November 1987. More than 200 LTTE guerrillas were killed and an arms depot seized. In order to give the commandos battle experience, 1 Para (SF) was rotated home in early 1988 and replaced by 9 Para (SF).

This battalion was scheduled to return home in June 1988, but the tour of duty was extended due to a planned air assault into the coastal swamps around Mullaittivu. The mission was a success, in that it located several arms caches. The 9 Para (SF) also provided 12 men for the security of the Indian High Commission in Sri Lanka.

Operation Cactus 1988, Maldives

With the capture of Maldives, an island nation off the south western coast of India, on 3 November 1988 by the People's Liberation Organisation of Tamil Eelam (PLOTE) mercenaries, the army turned to the 50 (Independent) Parachute Brigade to carry out an airborne/air attempt transported operation to liberate the country and return power to the legal government. This operation had 6 Para spearheading the mission. 6 Para flew in on 4 November 1988 in a fleet of IL-76, An-32 and An-12 transport aircraft. One team rescued the president, another took over the airfield, and a third rescued Maldivian security personnel besieged in the National Security Service HQ. Later 7 Para and part of 17 Para Field Regiment were also deployed to the Maldives. When mercenaries tried to escape by sea along with hostages, they were intercepted by the Indian Navy. Thus, 6 Para, and the 17 Para Field Regiment conducted the first-ever international intervention by the Indian Army without any loss of life.

1999 Kargil War
 

In 1999 nine out of ten Parachute battalions were deployed for Operation Vijay in Kargil, which bears testimony to the operational profile of the Regiment. While the Parachute Brigade cleared the Mushkoh Valley intrusions, 5 Para was actively involved in the forgotten sector of Batalik, and was awarded the Chief of Army Staff (COAS) Unit Citation and Theatre Honour Kargil for its resounding success against the Pakistani Army

Operation Khukri 2000, Sierra Leone
Operation Khukri was a rescue mission conducted by the 2 PARA (SF) in Sierra Leone in June 2000. About 90 operators commanded by Major (now Lt. Col.) Harinder Sood were airlifted from New Delhi to spearhead the mission to rescue 223 men of the 5/8 Gurkha Rifles who were surrounded and held captive by Revolutionary United Front (RUF) rebels for over 75 days. Just 90 Para (SF) forced 2000-5000 members of the Revolutionary United Front (RUF) divided into 5 battalions to surrender. This ultimately led to the liberation of Freetown.

Operation Summer Storm 2009
On 11 April 2009, the 57 Mountain Division of the Indian Army based in Manipur, 21 Para (SF) along with the Para-military Assam Rifles and State Police, launched a counter insurgency operation, code-named "Operation Summer Storm" in the Loktak Lake region and adjoining Loktak Lake in Bishnupur District, located south of State capital of Imphal. The first major mobilization of troops in 2009 ended on 21 April. As the troops began pulling out, an Army spokesperson described the operation as a success, disclosing that 129 militants, all belonging to the People's Revolutionary Party of Kangleipak (PREPAK) were killed. The Forces also claimed to have located and destroyed five militant camps during the Operation and more than 117 weapons, including sixty nine AK-series rifles, forty-eight rocket launchers, and an unspecified quantity of explosives and improvised explosive devices (IEDs). No militant was arrested. No fatality among the Special Force (SF) personnel or civilians was reported.

Ongoing counter-insurgency operations in Kashmir and in northeastern India

Paratroopers and Para (SF) have conducted thousands of counter-insurgency (COIN) operations in Jammu and Kashmir, Assam and the eastern states in India. Sometimes these units work with the Rashtriya Rifles (COIN force) in complicated operations. Since the mid-1990s, the role of Paratroopers and Para (SF) as a counter-terrorism force has increased substantially. They are now actively involved in counter terrorist (CT) and COIN operations in Kashmir as an essential part of the Home Ministry's decision to conduct pro-active raids against militants in the countryside and mountains. Personnel include Para (SF), Paratroopers (Airborne), and special units of the Rashtriya Rifles – a paramilitary unit created for counter-insurgency operations in Kashmir. They have also included MARCOS personnel, many of whom are seconded to the Army for CT operations.

Counter-terrorist operation in Samba
On 26 September 2013, terrorists dressed in Army fatigues stormed a police station and then an Army camp in the Jammu region killing 10 people, including an Army officer, in twin fidayeen attacks. The terrorists sneaked across the border early on Thursday, barely three days ahead of a meeting between the prime ministers of India and Pakistan. The attack was on a police station. The 16 Cavalry unit of the Army in Samba district falls under the jurisdiction of 9 corps, headquartered at Yol Cantonment in Himachal Pradesh. The three heavily armed terrorists, believed to be from the group Lashkar-e-Taiba (LeT), were holed up in the cavalry armored unit's camp at Samba for several hours after they barged into the Officers mess, until they were killed during a fierce gunfight with 1 Para (SF) of the army. The bodies of the three terrorists aged between 16 and 19 were in the custody of the Army.

Authorities moved commandos of 1 Para (SF) in helicopters to the shootout site. The Para (SF) commandos first carried out an aerial reconnaissance of the camp before landing to neutralize the three terrorists. The 1 Para (SF) had identified the exact spot during the aerial reconnaissance from where the intruders were returning the army fire. After landing, the commandos started engaging the terrorists in a direct gunfight, but in order to give them an impression that their exact hiding location had still not been identified, an abandoned building inside the camp was blasted. This made the terrorists complacent thinking that their hiding spot had not been yet been pin-pointed. They kept on intermittently returning army fire until all three of them were eliminated. The entire operation, from the moment the terrorists entered the camp until they were gunned down, took nearly nine hours to complete. The main worry of the soldiers tasked to eliminate the terrorists was the Army Public School situated some distance from the place where the terrorists had been engaged in a sustained firefight. Army men were worried about the possibility of the terrorists moving into the school and taking children and staff as hostage. For this reason, the operation to eliminate the terrorists was carried out with extreme caution and patience.

2015 Counter-insurgency operation in Myanmar

Based on precise intelligence inputs, the Indian Air Force and 21 Para (SF) carried a cross-border operation along the Indo-Myanmar border and destroyed two militant camps one each of the National Socialist Council of Nagaland (K) (NSCN) and the Kanglei Yawol Kanna Lup (KYKL). The operations were carried out inside Myanmar, along the Nagaland and Manipur border at two locations. One of the locations was near Ukhrul in Manipur. The army attacked two militants' transit camps.

70 commandos were reportedly involved in the operation. The commandos, equipped with assault rifles, rocket launchers, grenades and night vision goggles, were divided into two groups. The teams trekked through the thick jungles for at least  before they reached training camps. Each of the teams was further divided into two sub-groups. While one was responsible for the direct assault, the second formed an outer ring to prevent any of insurgents from running and escaping. The actual operation (hitting the camp and destroying it) took about 40 minutes. Indian Air Force Mil Mi-17 helicopters were put on standby, ready to be pressed into service to evacuate the commandos in case anything went wrong. In its statement after the operation, the Indian Army said it was in communication with Myanmar and that, "There is a history of close cooperation between our two militaries. We look forward to working with them to combat such terrorism."

The Indian Army claimed to have inflicted heavy casualties (158 reported) on the attackers behind the ambush of the Army on 4 June, which claimed the lives of 18 Army jawans (soldiers) of 6 Dogra Regiment from the Chandel district of Manipur. This has been noted as the largest attack on the Indian Army after the Kargil war of 1999.

Cross-LoC surgical strikes 2016

Intelligence gathering had started a few weeks prior, through drones, satellites and various other Indian assets, on 26 September 2016, small recon teams were given the task to infiltrate across the LoC, to carry out a 24 hour surveillance of the targets and to put together the best possible infiltration and exfiltration routes through the heavily mined and manned border in the world, the LoC. The intelligence was so strong that it's reported that the hit squads knew the names of the fidayeens at the launch pads. On return of the recon team, plans were laid down for the assault, and on 29 September 2016, India attacked the strike targeted areas across the Line of Control (LoC), where militants congregate for their final briefings before sneaking across into India. An Indian security source said the operation began with Indian forces firing artillery across the frontier to provide cover for three to four teams of 70–80 para SF commandos from 4 and 9 Para (Special Forces) to cross the LoC at several points shortly after midnight IST on 29 September (18:30 hours UTC, 28 Sept.). Teams from 4 Para SF crossed the LoC in the Nowgam sector of Kupwara district, with teams from 9 Para SF simultaneously crossing the LoC in Poonch district.[2] [16] By 2 a.m. IST, according to army sources, the special forces teams had travelled  –  on foot, the teams began the assault, with hand-held grenades and 84 mm rocket launchers destroying the ammo and the fuel dumps at the launch pads. Simultaneously, the sniping and assault teams opened fire, killing the terrorists at sight and those who tried to make a run. At first light, the teams swiftly returned to the Indian side of the LoC, suffering only one injury, a soldier wounded after tripping a land mine.[2]

The Indian army said the strike was a pre-emptive attack on the militants' bases, claiming that it had received intelligence that the militants were planning "terrorist strikes" against India.[36] [37] India said that, in destroying "terrorist infrastructure" it also attacked "those who are trying to support them," indicating it also attacked Pakistani soldiers.[48] India later briefed opposition parties and foreign envoys, but did not disclose operational details.[16] The footage from the strike captured by overhead drones and thermal imaging was released to the media afterwards. It was also informed that around 40-50 militants were killed and many more injured in one of the surgical strikes.
However, the Pakistan army dismissed India's claim, and instead claimed that Indian troops had not crossed the LoC but had only skirmished with Pakistani troops at the border, resulting in the deaths of two Pakistani soldiers and the wounding of nine.

2020 India-China border tensions 
The Para SF reportedly conducted reconnaissance against Chinese military posts near the Pangong Tso during the 2020 China–India skirmishes. They participated alongside the Special Frontier Force in occupying dominating positions of 'Black top', 'Gurung hill' ,'Helmet' and various other peaks and ridges on the southern bank of Pangong Tso, west of the Kailash Range in August 2020.

Organization

The Parachute Regiment presently has fifteen Special Forces, two Territorial Army, and one Counter-Insurgency (Rashtriya Rifles) battalion in its fold. Due to the absence of centralized command and lack of a centralized and standardized procedure for selection, even among the Para (SF) battalions, selection procedures vary. Meaning there is a different standard to get into different Para (SF) battalions.

In the mid-1980s, there were plans to take the three para commando battalions from the Parachute Regiment and bring them together under an individual special organization, the Special Forces Regiment. However, after several logistic and administrative obstacles, these plans were abandoned, and they continue to be trained and recruited by the Parachute Regiment.

Para (SF) operates in assault teams, which work individually behind enemy lines. The total strength of the Parachute Regiment stands at about 8,000-10,000 this includes one Rashtriya Rifles and two Territorial Army battalions, while the Para (SF) includes between 5,000-6,000 personnel or maybe more currently. They have to hide their identity from the general public.

The Special Group (aka 4 Vikas/22 SF/22 SG), a clandestine special forces unit which operates under Research and Analysis Wing, recruits from the PARA SF, MARCOS, Garud Commando Force. Currently the Para Special Forces consists of 15 battalions:
 1 PARA (SF) – Western Command
 2 PARA (SF) – Southern Command
 3 PARA (SF) – South-Western Command
 4 PARA (SF) – Northern Command
 5 PARA (SF) – 50(I) Para Brigade
 6 PARA (SF) – 50(I) Para Brigade
 7 PARA (SF) – 50(I) Para Brigade
 9 PARA (SF) – Northern Command 
 10 PARA (SF) – Southern Command
 11 PARA (SF) – Eastern Command
 12 PARA (SF) – Eastern Command
 13 PARA (SF) – Southern Command
 21 PARA (SF) – Eastern Command
 23 PARA (SF) – 50(I) Para Brigade
 29 PARA (SF) – 50(I) Para Brigade

Functions
 Intelligence gathering and special reconnaissance
 Sabotage of vital enemy infrastructure and communications through deep penetration and surgical strikes behind enemy lines.
 Covert and overt/direct action special operations as part of the Indian Army's counter-terrorism and counter-insurgency operations.
 Hostage rescue operations within and beyond Indian territory.

The unit is tasked with missions such as special operations, direct action, hostage rescue, counter-terrorism, special reconnaissance, foreign internal defence, counter-proliferation, counter-insurgency, seek and destroy, and personnel recovery.

Personnel

Selection

All Indian Special Forces operatives are volunteers. Some enter the Para regiments fresh from recruitment, while others transfer in from regular army units. They are put through a probationary period/selection process of three months for Para (Special Forces) battalions (1, 2, 3, 4, 5, 6, 7, 9, 10, 11, 12, 13 and 21, 23 and 29 PARA SF). In order to be a Para (Special Forces) operator, all personnel are first required to qualify as Paratroopers; once selected the candidates may choose to advance to the SF selection, which takes place twice a year in the spring and the autumn term.

There are fifteen Para (SF) battalions and soldiers are selected accordingly. An example of this would be the 10 Para (SF) who are also known as Desert Scorpions. The probation period for this unit is three-months and the probationers are selected accordingly for desert warfare. The 9 Para (SF) who specialise in Mountain warfare go through a six-month course at the Special Forces training school in Nahan, Himachal Pradesh, which is followed by further specialised selection. This concept of geographical specialisation was eventually modified and each Para (SF) battalion is now trained to operate in various terrains and climatic conditions.

Soldiers of the Indian Army can volunteer for the course irrespective of rank. Depending on the battalion, the probation period is for three months which doesn't include additional time for specialized skills. Over the probation period, all soldiers are stripped of their ranks, including officers, and are known as probationers or probies. A probationer may opt to leave anytime during the course. The completion rate is under 12-15 per cent and this slightly high completion rate is because many probationers are drawn from their regimental battalions. Every Special Forces operator specialises in various skills such as weapons handling, demolition, navigation, communication, and medical. PARA (SF) usually work in small teams of only six men, focusing on strategic reconnaissance, surveillance, target designation (RSTAD), hostage rescue and direct action (DA) tasks, and are selected and trained accordingly. Those who complete the probation period and are inducted into the Para (SF) undergo further selection and training, but to earn the Balidan Badge or "Badge of sacrifice", they have to further survive being deployed in active operations in hostile zones.

Training centres and courses 
 Commando Training Wing, Belgavi, Karnataka
 4-week High-Altitude Commando Course, Parvat Ghatak School in Tawang, Arunachal Pradesh
 Desert Warfare School, Rajasthan
 High Altitude Warfare School (HAWS), Sonamarg, Kashmir
 Basic Combat Divers Course, Indian Navy's Diving School, Kochi
 Counter insurgency, at the Counter Insurgency and Jungle Warfare School (CIJWS) in Vairengte, Mizoram
 Special Forces Training School, Bakloh, Himachal Pradesh 
 Basic Parachuting and Combat free-fall training (HAHO and HALO) at the Parachute Training School, Agra & Army Airborne Training School, Agra

90-day Selection 
Some of the training during the 90-day selection includes:

 Day 1 to 35: The first 35 days consists of 'Physical and Skills Training'. This includes hours of rigorous exercises apart from other tests and skills training such as blindfolded team assembly, weapons training, demolition, navigation, communication, medical and cooking skills. Probationers are also taught animal handling skills, Probationers go without food for 4 days, they have to minimize water consumption up to 1 litre water for 3 days and be able to go without sleep for 7 days. A 10 kg sandbag becomes a permanent buddy for the probationer. Routine speed marches and runs of 10 km, 20 km, 30 km and 40 km with full battle gears are conducted. Probationers must be exceptional navigators in areas where there is no network signal, no roads or landmarks and sand dunes that keep shifting every night.[40] In Parachute training, candidates then complete a 3-week Basic Parachute Course at the Indian Army's Parachute Training School in Agra. insertion and extraction techniques and have to learn several languages. Many probationers are not able to complete this stage of the course itself and up to 20% drop out here.
 Day 45: The 36-hour Para SF stress test includes 36 hours of exercises, maneuvers, insertion, extraction where the probationers stress capabilities are put to the test. It starts with a 10 km speed march with 30 kg battle loads and an additional 40 kg each. This is followed by various exercises included lifting buddies over long periods. This is followed by weight shifting. Weight shifting has three rounds, where various kinds of weights have to be shifted such as 40 litres of jerry cans, tyre trucks and wooden logs up to 85 kg in weight. During the 11th hour, trial by water is conducted – simulated drowning, allowing only the bare minimum oxygen over a long period of time. This is to test probationers panic reactions under stress. The hands are also tied later on and using ropes the probationers are pulled under water. It is well known that hypoxia and blackout due to lack of oxygen is common during this test. The first 16 hours are completed without a drop of water or food. This is followed by immediate observational skills and operation tactics under pressure which included probationary having to recall objects placed in their exercises. This is followed by 10 km speed march and 6 hours of continuous exercises. Finally practical combat skills tested such as placing ambushes, response to an ambush, making camps, stretchers and simulated evacs. This is all done at the last stage of the stress test under lack of sleep and extreme fatigue mainly to test mental endurance of the probationers under such conditions and how they react. The 36 hours stress test also sees many probationers leave.
 Day 56: The Para SF 100 km endurance run is a must for all probationers. With 10 kg battle load and personal weapon of 7 kg they have to run 100 km. The time taken averages 13 to 15 hours. A known route the Para SF have used for this run is the hilly route between Rampur and Dakkal. The run is divided into four stages.
 Day 60 to 90: The final and toughest test is reserved for those who make it to this stage, the Counter Terror Operations. Not much is publicly known about this stage or the other parts of this course.

At the end of the 90-day probation period, the successful candidates receive and wear their maroon berets for the first time and go through a glass-eating tradition.

Training

The training in SF battalions is a continuous process. In the special forces, the members are imparted both basic and advanced training. They are taught specialized modes of infiltration and exfiltration, either by air (combat freefall) or sea (combat diving). Both High Altitude Low Opening (HALO) and High Altitude High Opening (HAHO) techniques are learned.

The commandos are sent to the Naval Diving School, Kochi for combat diving training. Like other special forces, these SF operators are trained for land, air and water.

The daily routine begins with a  morning run. Infiltration, exfiltration, assault, room and building intervention, intelligence gathering, patrolling, ambush tactics, counter-ambush tactics, counter-insurgency, counter-terrorism, unconventional warfare, guerilla warfare, asymmetric warfare, raids and sabotage, martial arts training, tactical shooting, stress firing, reflex shooting, buddy system drills, close quarter battle, tactical driving, advance weapon courses and handling, sniping, demolition training, survival skills, linguistic training, logistic training, trade-craft training is imparted by the intelligence agencies. The training drills involve live ammunition at all times which is a reason for fatal accidents at times leading to death.

Night and weapons training and field craft involving  treks with  loads and live ammunition are conducted.

In addition to this in-house training, the commandos also attend a number of schools run by the Army that specialize in terrain and environmental warfare. These include the Junior Leaders' Commando Training Camp in Belgaum, Karnataka, the Parvat Ghatak School (for high altitude mountain warfare) in Tawang Arunachal Pradesh, the desert warfare school in Rajasthan, the High Altitude Warfare School (HAWS) in Sonamarg, Kashmir, the Counterinsurgency and Jungle Warfare School (CIJWS) in Vairengte, Mizoram, and the Indian special forces training school in Nahan, Himachal Pradesh. These schools are among the finest of their kind anywhere, and routinely host students from other countries.

Members of USSOCOM (United States Special Operations Command) and UKSF (United Kingdom Special Forces) have conducted joint training exercises with the Indian Paras. SOF members from the three nations routinely train at each other's facilities to improve military cooperation and tactical skills. This allows the SOF operators from each nation to see tactics and perspectives offered by other top-notch organizations. It is thought that the French Foreign Legion also has approached CIJWS regarding the courses taught by them. Para SF troops can also undergo a complete Combat Divers course, after which they earn a combat diver badge.

They are also experienced in conducting SHBO (special heliborne operations) and typically employ Cheetahs, MI-8/MI-17, or HAL (Dhruv) helicopters for this purpose.

Joint exercises with other nations

The Para (SF) conduct a series of joint exercises, named Vajra Prahar, with the United States Army every year, in which about 100 personnel from the US and Indian special forces participate. INDRA is a series of joint exercise with Russian special forces, and operation Sampriti is the name for joint exercises with Bangladeshi special forces. Para (SF) also conducts exercises and training with the special forces of Israel. The Ajeya Warrior is a series of exercises with the SFSG of the UK. Indian special forces also conduct exercises with forces of the following 16 friendly countries: the United States, France, the UK, Russia, Mongolia, Kazakhstan, Uzbekistan, Kyrgyzstan, Bangladesh, Myanmar, Nepal, Maldives, Seychelles, Singapore, Indonesia and Thailand.

International competitions
Personnel from the Para (SF) have participated in international competitions like Airborne Africa, Cambrian Patrol. This exercise was designed to test the special forces community's endurance, combat efficiency, and combat readiness. The regiment has a record of highest tally wins in both these exercises that is hosted annually ever since their participation was inducted in the competition hosted by Botswana in Africa's Kalahari Desert from 8–10 June 2002, in which 10 Para (SF) participated. Special forces from other nations like the Special Air Service of the UK and the Green Berets of the US also participated.

In 2014 and 2021 teams from the Indian army won the gold medal out of the 140 teams that participated in Exercise Cambrian Patrol held in the UK.

Influence on foreign units 
The Para SF has provided training to special forces from Afghanistan and Tajikistan. In December 2013, 60 Afghan special forces were trained by the 10 Para (SF) at the Thar Desert. A month earlier, the Tajik special forces had undergone training. In 2021, Uzbek airborne forces were also trained in specialized para operations.

Armoury
The following equipment are reportedly used by the Para (SF):

Small Arms

Pistol
Beretta 92FS  Semi-automatic Pistol
Beretta Px4 Storm Semi-automatic Pistol
Pistol 9mm 1-A Semi-automatic Pistol
FN Five-seven Semi-automatic Pistol
Glock Semi-automatic Pistol
IWI Jericho 941 Semi-automatic Pistol
Sub-machine Gun
B&T MP9 9mm Machine Pistol
Heckler & Koch MP5 Sub-Machine Gun
Micro Uzi 9mm Sub-Machine Gun
Assault Rifle
M4A1 5.56mm Carbine
IWI TAR-21 Tavor 5.56mm Assault Rifle
AK-47 (SOPMOD) 7.62×39mm Assault Rifle
FN SCAR L,H assault rifle
SIG Sauer 716i 7.62mm Battle Rifle
IMI Galil SAR 5.56mm Assault Rifle
Sniper Rifle
IWI Galil Sniper 7.62mm Semi-automatic sniper Rifle
Sako TRG .338 Lapua Magnum Sniper Rifle
Barrett M107A1 Anti-material Sniper Rifle
Beretta Victrix Scorpio TGT .338 Lapua Magnum Sniper Rifle
Machine Gun
IWI Negev NG-7 Light Machine Gun
PKM General Purpose Machine Gun
MK48 Light Machine Gun
Rocket Launcher
C-90-CR-RB (M3) Rocket Propelled Grenade.
RL MkIII 84mm Recoilless Rifle
Carl Gustaf recoilless rifle(Mark-4) Light Weight Recoilless Rifle.
B-300 Shipon 82mm Rocket launcher
Spike (ATGM) Anti-Tank Guided Missile

Transport
C-130J Super Hercules tactical transport aircraft.
Boeing C-17 Globemaster III transport aircraft.
HAL Dhruv utility helicopter.
HAL Chetak utility helicopter
All Terrain Vehicles

Insignia

Para (SF) personnel, like other parachute troops in the Indian military, wear a maroon beret after they clear the Paratrooper (Air) course during the initial stages of probation. Their beret insignia is same as what paratroopers of regular para battalions wear.

The key factor that separates Para (SF) personnel from Paratroopers, apart from their doctrine, training & task, is that the former wear Special Forces tab on each shoulder and the Balidan Badge, translated as "Badge of Sacrifice", on their right pocket below the nameplate. Only the Special Forces personnel are allowed to wear these insignias after successfully completing the SF training and a certain number of successful combat ops.

Para SF personnel are allowed to grow hair & beard, as this allows them to blend in with the civilian population, especially in Jammu and Kashmir and terrorism-plagued areas.

Gallantry awards

Maha Vir Chakra
1965, Lt. General (then Major) Ranjit Singh Dyal of 1 Para (Special Forces) captured Haji pir pass under Operation Bakshi of 1965 war.
1971, Brigadier (then Lt. Colonel) Swai Bhawani Singh of 10 Para (Special Forces) for the capture of large areas of Chachro and Virawah in Pakistan during 1971 war.
 1971 Maj Gen (Then Lt Col) Kulwant Singh Pannu of 2 PARA (Maratha) now Special Forces who led 2 PARA in the Airborne Assault on Poongli Bridge, in Tangail, and subsequently led the Indian Army's entry into Dhaka with his unit.
1965, Brigadier (then Lt. Colonel) Russell Lazarus of the 3rd Para for setting up the 3rd Para in Agra and action in the 1965 War

Vir Chakra
1988, Maj. General (then Lt. Colonel) Dalvir Singh, of 10 Para (Special Forces) for the rescue of 74 SF personnel as well as the infantry personnel trapped, along with recovery of 6 fatal SF casualties during the Operation Jaffna University Helidrop in 1987.

Ashok Chakra
 1971, Brigadier Russell Lazarus MVC of the 3rd Para, Military Attache at the Indian High Commission, Pakistan for espionage activities leading to the 1971 War .
1995, (Posthumous) Captain Arun Singh Jasrotia of 9 Para (Special Forces) for eliminating terrorists in Lolab Valley during operation Rakshak.
1999, (Posthumous) Major Sudhir Kumar Walia of 9 Para (Special Forces) for killing 9 terrorists single-handedly during operation Rakshak in Haphruda forest of Kashmir.
2003, (Posthumous) Paratrooper Sanjog Chhetri of 9 Para(Special Forces) for operation Sarp Vinash in Poonch.
2007, (Posthumous) Captain Harshan R Nair of the 2 Para(Special Forces) for Baramulla Operation, 20th Mar 2007, eliminating four terrorists including, two top leaders. 
2009, (Posthumous) Major Mohit Sharma of 1 Para(Special Forces) for Counter-insurgency Operations in Jammu and Kashmir in 2009.
2016, (Posthumous) Lance Naik Mohan Nath Goswami of 9 Para(Special Forces) for Counter-insurgency Operations in Jammu and Kashmir in 2016.

Kirti Chakra

1994, Maj Gen (then Lt Col) SK Razdan of 7 Para for Counter-insurgency operation Op Rhino in 1994.
2001,(Posthumous) Capt. R. Subramanian of 1 Para(Special Forces) for counter-insurgency operations in Kupwara area of Jammu and Kashmir in 2000
2009, Brig.(then Lt. Colonel) Saurabh Singh Shekhawat of 21 Para(Special Forces) for a classified operation in Manipur in 2008.
2010,(Posthumous) Capt. Davinder Singh Jass, of 1 Para (Special Forces) for a counter-insurgency operations in Sopore area of Jammu and Kashmir in 2010
2011, Lt Vikas Sharma of 6 Para for Counter-insurgency operation in Jammu & Kashmir in 2011.
2015, Lt. Colonel. Nectar Sanjenbam of 21 Para(Special Forces) for 2015 Myanmar Cross Border Raid. 
2015, Captain Jaidev Dangi of 10 Para (Special Forces) for eliminating a terrorist in Pulwama in 2014.
2017, Lt. Colonel.(then Major) Rohit Suri of 4 Para(Special Forces) for the Surgical strike against terrorist launch pads across the Line of Control in Pakistani-administered Kashmir in 2016.
2021, (Posthumous) Sub. Sanjiv Kumar of 4 Para(Special Forces) for Counter Insurgency Op in Kupwara, Kashmir in 2020. 
2009,(Posthumous) Paratrooper Shabir Ahmad Malik of 1 Para SF for fighting terrorists at Kupwara , Kashmir on 21 March 2009 .

Shaurya Chakra
1985, Lt. General (then Major) Prakash Chand Katoch of 1 Para(Special Forces) for Operation Blue Star, in 1984.
1998, Col (then 2/Lt) Paramjeet Singh Bajwa of 6 Para for Counter-Insurgency Operation in Jammu & Kashmir.
1998,(Posthumous) Ptr, Baldev Raj of 6 Para for Counter-Insurgency Operation in Jammu & Kashmir which resulted in killing of 9 militants.
1999,(Posthumous) Ptr, Gian Singh of 6 Para for Counter-Insurgency Operation in Jammu & Kashmir.
2002, Col (then Lt) Manav Yadav of 1 Para(Special Forces) for Counter-Insurgency Operation in Kashmir.
2004, (Posthumous) Major Udai Singh of 1 Para(Special Forces) for Rajouri operation in 2003.
2008, Colonel.(then Major) N. S. Bal of 2 Para(Special Forces) for a covert operation in Lolab Valley in 2008. 
2010, Capt Tushar Dhasmana of 6 Para for Counter-Insurgency Operation in Jammu & Kashmir.
2014, Major (then Lieutenant) Manish Singh of 9 Para(Special Forces) for Operation in Kashmir in 2012.
2016, (Posthumous) Captain Pawan Kumar of 10 Para(Special Forces) for 2016 Pampore stand-off.
2016, (Posthumous) Captain Tushar Mahajan of 9 Para(Special Forces) for 2016 Pampore stand-off.
2017, Major D. K. Upadhyay of 9 Para(Special Forces) for 2016 Surgical Strike in Pakistan 
2017, Major Rajat Chandra of 4 Para(Special Forces) for 2016 Surgical Strike in Pakistan 
2017, Captain Ashutosh Kumar of 4 Para(Special Forces) for 2016 Surgical Strike in Pakistan
2017, Nb. Subedar Vijay Kumar of 4 Para(Special Forces) for 2016 Surgical Strike in Pakistan 
2017, Ptr. Abdul Qayum of 9 Para(Special Forces) for 2016 Surgical Strike in Pakistan
2018, Col(then Major) Vikrant Prashar of 10 Para(Special Forces) for a covert operation in Kashmir, 2018.
2019, Nb. Subedar Anil Kumar Dahiya of 1 Para(Special Forces) for killing 3 terrorists, during a covert strike across the Line of Control in 2018.
2021, Ptr. Sonam Tshering Tamang of 4 Para(Special Forces) for killing 2 terrorists and for evacuating his squad commander, in 2020.

See also
Special Forces of India
National Security Guard
Special Air Service

References

Bibliography 
 Gen. P. C. Katoch, Saikat Datta (2013). India's Special Forces: 1: History and Future of Special Forces. VIJ Books (India) Pty Ltd. 
 Col V S Yadav. (2012) Employment of Special Forces: Challenges and Opportunities for the Future. Centre for Joint Warfare Studies (New Delhi).

External links

Jawed Naqwi, India had planned offensive, Dawn, 24 December 2002.
 Para Commandos

Special forces of India
Airborne units and formations
Military counterterrorist organizations
Infantry regiments of the Indian Army from 1947
Units of the Indian Peace Keeping Force